(ADP-ribosyl)hydrolase 3 (ARH3) is an enzyme that in humans is encoded by the ADPRHL2 gene (also called ADPRS).
This enzyme reverses the proteins’ post-translational addition of ADP-ribose to serine residues as part of the DNA damage response The enzyme is also known to cleave poly(ADP-ribose) polymers, 1''-O-acetyl-ADP-ribose and alpha-NAD+

Role in disease 
Loss-of-function mutations in the ADPRHL2 gene result in a recently defined disorder called stress-induced childhood-onset neurodegeneration with variable ataxia and seizures (CONDSIAS; OMIM: 618170). The CONDSIAS is an autosomal recessive disorder which its pertinent gene (ADPRHL2) is mapped on chromosome 1p35.3-p34.1. The phenotypes of this disorder have been reported as neurodegeneration, variable ataxia and seizures, tremor, nystagmus, balance problems, cerebellar, spinal cord and cerebral atrophy, hearing impairment and occasionally hearing loss, ptosis, ophthalmoplegia, dysarthria, muscle weakness, axonal neuropathy, dysmetria, and tongue fasciculation. Symptoms and severity of the disorder appear to be different in patients and sometimes lead to early childhood death. In other words, although older patients present most of the above-mentioned symptoms, younger patients experience loss of developmental milestones and death in their early infancy.

See also
ADP-ribosylhydrolase

References

External links

Further reading